Flete is a village in Kent.

Flete may also refer to:

People
John Flete ( 1398–1466), English monk and ecclesiastical historian
William Flete, 14th-century Augustinian hermit friar
William Flete (MP) for Hertfordshire (UK Parliament constituency)

Places
Flete House, Devon

See also
 Fleet (disambiguation)